Belgundi is a village in Belgaum district in the southern state of Karnataka, India. The local languages are Kannada and Marathi. The village is located at the state border of Karnataka and Maharashtra.

References

Villages in Belagavi district